Anthony Stephen Knowland (22 March 1919 – 10 December 2006) was a professor of English literature, specialising in the work of W.B. Yeats, William Shakespeare and classical Greek literature. Apart from his passion for literature, he loved music, was an accomplished pianist, and an enthusiastic cook. A gentle, unassuming person, humorous, warm and kind, he was a committed humanist and pacifist. He had no truck with status, celebrity or power.

Early life and education
He was born in Hove, Sussex, one of seven children of Albert James Knowland and Maria Maud Knowland (née Sturley). Tony was educated at Dulwich College and later at Frensham Heights, Surrey, where he became head boy and studied Latin and Greek with Rex Warner, the eminent classical scholar and novelist. He won an open exhibition to Exeter College, Oxford, in 1938. There he read classics until the outbreak of war, gaining a 'wartime' degree. In 1947, he returned to Exeter College where he read English with Nevill Coghill, the well-known Chaucerian and Shakespearean scholar and man of the theatre. He gained a first-class degree and was invited to Toronto University as lecturer in English in 1950.

Conscientious objector
As a captain in the Suffolk 3rd Division of the army, Prof Knowland was involved in planning the Second Front. However, always doubtful about the legitimacy of war, he became a conscientious objector before the invasion, and was court martialled in 1944. He was represented at the court martial by Raymond Blackburn and was dismissed from the army service, but was confined to Windsor Castle for two months because of his knowledge of the invasion plans. On his release he was employed as a teacher at Frensham Heights, although within weeks as a civilian he was called up again and had to put his case to the Conscientious Objectors Tribunal at Reading where it was decreed that, having once put himself at risk of imprisonment, he should be allowed to stand down and return to teaching.

Magee University, Londonderry
In 1953, he took up a post at Magee University, Londonderry, where he was elected to the chair of English. At Magee, as well as directing several Shakespeare plays, he founded a music society at which many distinguished musicians performed, including Julian Bream, Amaryllis Fleming, Alan Loveday, Ralph Homes, Lamar Crowson, Frederick Grinke and the 14-year-old Jacqueline du Pré. Contrary to the prevailing ethos of the university Prof Knowland insisted that Roman Catholics be allowed to join the society.

St Clare’s, Oxford
In 1960 he joined St Clare's, Oxford, and was responsible for directing the academic programme for external London degrees and a liberal arts programme for visiting American students. Prof Knowland became Vice-Principal in 1972.

Literary career
Tony's professional career took him on visiting professorships to the universities of Connecticut and Munich. He published work on 17th-century drama, translations of Sophocles and Aristophanes and was an authority on W.B. Yeats. His book, W.B. Yeats, Dramatist of Vision was published both in the United Kingdom and America. Electronic versions of some of these works are available through the library at St Clare's, Oxford and Oxford University's Bodleian Library digital archive. Selected works include (dates are dates of authorship or publication unless better dates are available):-
A Commentary on the Collected Plays of W. B. Yeats, with A. Norman Jeffares, Stanford University Press (1975)
A Companion To The Lyrical Poems Of W.B. Yeats
For The Time Being: A Christmas Oratorio by W.H. Auden. A shortened version, together with an explanatory commentary, adapted for performance on television
Journey to the Spirit: An Introduction to Walter de la Mare’s poem, The Traveller and other poems by Walter de la Mare, (1957)
Letters To A Young Poet by Rainer-Maria Rilke: A version by Tony Knowland, (1987)
Llewelyn Powys
Oedipus At Colonus: A version for acting of Sophocles’ Oedipus at Colonus
Oedipus: A version for acting of Sophocles's Oedipus Tyrannus
Poems (Includes the poem 'Guernica' first published in Spain at War, No. 8 (November 1938), p307 and republished in The Penguin Book of Spanish Civil War Verse edited by Valerie Cunningham. Penguin Books (1980), p167
Shakespeare's Hamlet: A Paraphrase or ‘The Murder of Hamlet – what Shakespeare really meant’
Shakespeare's Macbeth and its interpretation for the Elizabethan stage
Shakespeare's Romeo and Juliet: A paraphrase into modern English
Six Caroline plays (World's classics-no.583), Oxford University Press (1962)
The Plays: As You Like It
The Plays: Much Ado About Nothing
The Poet and the War, (Not known but assumed to be at the time of the Spanish Civil War)
The Professor At The Seminar Table or Tony's Shakespeare Tutorials, (1988)
The Sound Of Meaning: A vocal analysis of T.S. Eliot’s Four Quartets
The Thoughtful Songs of James Simmons, in Poets of Northern Ireland, edited by Elmer Andrews, London, MacMillan, (1993)
Three Greek Plays: Versions For Acting of Aristophanes, Lysistrata – The Peacemakers; Sophocles, Antigone; Euripides, Bacchae – The Bacchanals (1985)
Troilus and Cressida (1956)
T.S. Eliot Four Quartets: An Approach to the Meaning
Two Christmas Plays. To be performed in church, with carols. The Annunciation and The Shepherds’ Play adapted from the medieval Coventry, Chester, Towneley and York cycles
W.B. Yeats A Personal Reading
W.B. Yeats, Dramatist of Vision (Irish Literary Studies), Barnes & Noble Imports (1983)
W.B. Yeats: Words and Music
Woman into Goddess: Yeats’s poetic treatment of Maud Gonne, (1967)
Yeats and Eliot: Some Points Of Contact by A.S. Knowland. A lecture delivered at the eleventh international Yeats Summer School, (1970)

Folk music
Passionately interested in folk music, Prof Knowland made many recordings from the 1950s onwards of musicians on the west coast of Ireland and these are lodged in Ireland's National Archive. Of particular note are the only surviving recordings of two fiddle players from a travelling family, the Raineys, a CD of which was launched in Dublin in 2006, and which has been hailed as one of the finest examples in existence of the traditional Irish fiddle style. His recordings are featured on the following CDs:-

The Raineys, Pavee Point (2007)
Tony and the Yoke in Connemara (2010)
Travellers & Fellow Travellers: Keepers of the Flame, Pure Records (2006)

Personal life
In December 1943, he married Barbara Amy Morris (1 May 1926 – 4 August 2014), the eldest daughter of John Morris (co-founder of Boriswood publishers) and Pamela Paramythioti (co-founder of St Clare's, Oxford) and granddaughter of the composer Amy Horrocks. Living in Oxford and finally, Woodstock, Oxfordshire, they had 5 children and also built a holiday home (Castle Cottage) in Renvyle, County Galway, Ireland where their ashes are scattered.

References

British academics of English literature
1919 births
2006 deaths
People from Hove